This was the first edition of the tournament.

Oleksii Krutykh and Oriol Roca Batalla won the title after defeating Ivan and Matej Sabanov 6–3, 7–6(7–3) in the final.

Seeds

Draw

References

External links
 Main draw

Copa Faulcombridge - Doubles